The following is a timeline of the history of the city of Herat, Afghanistan.

Prior to 15th century

 500 BCE - Persian town in Aria established (approximate date).
 330 BCE - Artacoana captured by Alexander III of Macedon.
 167 BCE - Town becomes part of the Parthian Empire.
 127 BCE - Town becomes part of the Kushan Empire
 642 CE - Siege of Herat; Arabs in power.
 1042 - City besieged by Seljuq Tughril.
 1064 - Alp Arslan in power.
 1102 - Earthquake.
 1157 - The city was destroyed by an irruption of the Ghuzz, the predecessors of the modern Turkomans.
 1163 - Bobrinski Bucket produced in Herat.
 1175 - Ghurids in power.
 1197 - Conflict between blacksmiths' and coppersmiths' bazaars.
 1201 - Construction of new Friday Mosque begins.
 1221 - City sacked by Mongols.
 1244 - Shams al-Din Kurt in power.
 1300 - Herat Citadel reinforced.
 1364 - Earthquake.
 1380 - City taken by forces of Timur.

15th-19th centuries
 1405 - Capital of Timurid dynasty relocated to Herat from Samarkand.
 1410 - "Bazaars reconstructed."
 1425 - Tomb of Khwaja 'Abd Allah Ansari built at Gazurgah (near city).
 1438 - Gawhar Shad Mausoleum built.
 1448 - Siege of Herat (1448).
 1460s - "Royal Canal" built.
 1469 - Sultan Husayn Mirza Bayqarah in power.
 1482 - Ikhlasiyya (educational and charitable complex) built outside city (approximate date).
 1500 - Friday Mosque rebuilt.
 1507 - Uzbek Muhammad Shaybani in power.
 1510 - City taken by Safavid Shah Ismail; Shamlu Turkomans in power.
 1528 - Safavid Shah Tahmasp in power.
 1716 - Abdali Afghan revolt.
 1729 - Nader Shah in power.
 1732 - Afghan revolt suppressed.
 1750 - City becomes part of the Durrani Empire.
1801 - City becomes independent.
1807
July–August: City is besieged by Iran.
1818 
April: City incorporated into the Durrani Empire. Later that year the Durranis are kicked out of most of Afghanistan, Herat becomes their last stronghold.
 1837
23 November: Siege of Herat by Persian forces begins.
 1842
Early 1842: Yar Muhammad Khan Alakozai deposes Kamran Shah and becomes the new ruler.
 1851
June 11: Sa'id Muhammad Khan in power.
1852
March–May: City is briefly occupied by the Persians.
 1855 
September 15: Muhammad Yusuf in power.
 1856
April: Persian siege of Herat begins.
October 25: Persians take the city of Herat.
 1857 
September: Persian control of city ends per Treaty of Paris; Sultan Jan installed as ruler of Herat.
1862
27 July: City is besieged by the Muhammadzais.
 1863
 26 May: City taken by forces of Dost Mohammad Khan.
 Mohammad Yaqub Khan in power.
 1880 - Abd al-Rahman Khan in power.
 1885 - Under the orders of the Amir, the Mosalla was destroyed.

20th century

 1922 / 1301 SH - Solar Hijri calendar officially adopted in Afghanistan.
 1925 - Herat National Museum established.
 1947 - Radio Kabul transmissions begin to reach Herat (approximate date).
 1960s - Kandahar-Herat highway constructed.
 1973 - Population: 108,750.
 1979
 March: Uprising.
 City bombed by Soviet forces.
 1988 - Population: 177,300 (estimate).
 1993 - Mines cleared.

21st century
 2010 - Population: 410,700.
 2016 - Population: 491,967.

See also
 List of governors of Herat province
 Khorasan
 Timelines of other cities in Afghanistan: Kabul

References

This article incorporates information from the Russian Wikipedia.

Bibliography

Published in 19th century
 
 
 
 
 
 
 
 
 
 
 

Published in 20th century
 
 
 
 
 
 
 
 
 
 
 

Published in 21st century

External links

 
 
 Map of Herāt and surroundings in 1942

Years in Afghanistan
 
Herat
herat